Claude Arnaiz (1 July 1931 – 22 November 2009) was a French boxer. He competed in the men's light heavyweight event at the 1952 Summer Olympics.

References

1931 births
2009 deaths
French male boxers
Olympic boxers of France
Boxers at the 1952 Summer Olympics
People from Angoulême
Sportspeople from Charente
Light-heavyweight boxers